Juan Alberto Barbas (born 23 August 1959 in San Martín, Buenos Aires) is a retired Argentine footballer who played as an attacking or defensive midfielder. He played for a number of clubs in Argentina, Spain, Italy, and Switzerland before turning his hand to management in 2009 with Racing Club de Avellaneda.

Club career
Barbas started his career in 1977 at Racing Club de Avellaneda in the Argentine Primera División. He then went on to play for Real Zaragoza in Spain, U.S. Lecce in Italy, FC Locarno, and FC Sion in Switzerland.

Barbas was a part of the Sion team that won the 1991–1992 Swiss Championship.

After another spell at Locarno, Barbas returned to Argentina where he had a short spell with Club Atlético Huracán before dropping down to the lower leagues to play for Alvarado de Mar del Plata and then All Boys, where he retired in 1997.

International career
Barbas was part of the Argentina Under-20 squad that won the 1979 FIFA World Youth Championship, he went on to play for Argentina 33 times including appearances at the 1982 FIFA World Cup.

Style of play
An offensive minded midfielder, with an eye for goal, Barbas's main traits as a footballer were his excellent vision and accurate striking ability from outside the area; he was also a good free kick taker.

Coaching career
On 13 October 2009, Racing Club de Avellaneda officials hired their former player as their caretaker coach, replacing Ricardo Caruso Lombardi.

Honours

Club
 FC Sion
Swiss Super League: 1991–92

International
 Argentina Under-20
FIFA World Youth Championship: 1979

References

External links

1959 births
Living people
Sportspeople from Buenos Aires Province
Argentine footballers
Argentine expatriate footballers
Racing Club de Avellaneda footballers
Real Zaragoza players
U.S. Lecce players
Club Atlético Huracán footballers
FC Locarno players
FC Sion players
Argentine Primera División players
La Liga players
Serie A players
Serie B players
Swiss Super League players
Swiss Challenge League players
Expatriate footballers in Italy
Expatriate footballers in Spain
Expatriate footballers in Switzerland
1979 Copa América players
1982 FIFA World Cup players
Argentina youth international footballers
Argentina under-20 international footballers
Argentina international footballers
Argentine football managers
Racing Club de Avellaneda managers
Association football defenders
Association football utility players